Bamum, also spelled Bamoum, Bamun, or Bamoun, may refer to:
The Bamum people
The Bamum kingdom
The Bamum language
The Bamum script
 Bamum (Unicode block)
 Bamum Scripts and Archives Project

Language and nationality disambiguation pages